Bourletiella viridescens is a species of springtail. Its common name is "Garden Springtail"

References

External links
 "Tiny creature in UK record first" (BBC News, 6 September 2009)
 

Collembola
Arthropods of Australia